Pantodapoi (meaning "of every kind/of all sorts") were native auxiliary soldiers used in the armies of the Diadochi, the rival generals of Alexander the Great, who fought for control over his empire after his death in 323 BC. Because the Diadochi were reluctant to allow native troops to serve in mainstream Hellenic units for fear of revolt, they formed their own corps and were used in a support role, for flanking enemy troops and skirmishing. They gave decent accounts of themselves in many battles, but were the first Seleucid line to break at the battle of Raphia against the Ptolemaic Kingdom, another successor kingdom.

See also
Phalangite

Ancient Greek military terminology
Military units and formations of the Hellenistic world
Military units and formations of ancient Greece